Humphrey Sumner, D.D. (b Eton 15 September 1743; d Cambridge 23 March 1814) was an English Anglican priest and educationalist.

The son of John Sumner, Headmaster of Eton he was himself educated at the college. He entered King's College, Cambridge in 1762, graduating B.A in 1767 and M.A  in 1770. He was appointed a Fellow of Kings in 1765; and on the staff of Eton from 1767 to 1790. He held livings at Dunton Wayletts, Copdock and Washbrook. Sumner was Provost of King's College, Cambridge from 1850 until his death; and twice Vice-Chancellor of the University of Cambridge: from 1798 to 1799, and 1802 to 1803.

References

People educated at Eton College
Provosts of King's College, Cambridge
Fellows of King's College, Cambridge
Alumni of King's College, Cambridge
1814 deaths
1743 births
People from Eton, Berkshire
19th-century English Anglican priests
Vice-Chancellors of the University of Cambridge
Teachers at Eton College